Carolina Conceição Martins Pereira (born 18 February 1983), known as Carol Carioca, is a Brazilian former footballer who played as a centre back. Carol Carioca was part of the Equatorial Guinea women's national football team at the 2011 FIFA Women's World Cup. On 5 October 2017, Carol Carioca and other nine Brazilian footballers were declared by FIFA as ineligible to play for Equatorial Guinea.

Football career
Carol Carioca first became involved in footballer through her father, who she both attended games with and watched televised matches. She would also play street football with teams of boys, although her mother disapproved. Pereira is Brazilian by birth, but had been invited to Equatorial Guinea to play football in 2007. After staying in the country, she was recruited for the women's national football team. She caught malaria the following year, which she said was one of the low lights of her career along with the results of a career threatening ankle surgery in 2009 which she was told might mean she could no longer play football. As a footballer, she plays under the name "Carol Carioca".

In April 2010, Carol Carioca was one of several high-profile players who helped draw the group states of the FIFA U-20 Women's World Cup held later that year in Germany. Pereira was included in the Equatorial Guinea squad for the 2011 FIFA Women's World Cup, held in Germany. This was the first time the nation had qualified to appear at the Women's World Cup, and Pereira said that doing so was her proudest moment as a footballer so far. The first round match between Equatorial Guinea and Brazil was the first time a Brazilian player naturalized for another nation had played against them in women's football.

When Carol Carioca was a member of the Equatorial Guinea team that won the 2012 African Women's Championship, she was one of 11 out of the 21 players who were naturalized Brazilians playing as Equatoguineans.

Carol Carioca retired from playing on 18 November 2021 after reaching with Malabo Kings FC the fourth place of the CAF Women's Champions League inaugural edition. Following the loss to ASFAR for the third-place match, she expressed to media she would continue to be linked to women's football.

Notes

References

1983 births
Living people
Footballers from Rio de Janeiro (city)
Brazilian women's footballers
Women's association football central defenders
CR Vasco da Gama (women) players
Santos FC (women) players
Botucatu Futebol Clube players
FF USV Jena players
Associação Acadêmica e Desportiva Vitória das Tabocas players
Associação Desportiva Centro Olímpico players
Hapoel Be'er Sheva F.C. (women) players
Frauen-Bundesliga players
WK League players
Ligat Nashim players

Equatorial Guinea women's international footballers
2011 FIFA Women's World Cup players

Brazilian expatriate women's footballers
Brazilian expatriate sportspeople in Germany
Expatriate women's footballers in Germany
Brazilian expatriate sportspeople in South Korea
Expatriate women's footballers in South Korea
Brazilian expatriate sportspeople in Israel
Expatriate women's footballers in Israel
Brazilian expatriate sportspeople in Equatorial Guinea
Expatriate women's footballers in Equatorial Guinea